The Poway synagogue shooting occurred on April 27, 2019, at Chabad of Poway synagogue in Poway, California, United States, a city approximately  north of San Diego, on the last day of the Jewish Passover holiday, which fell on a Shabbat. Armed with an AR-15 style rifle, John Timothy Earnest fatally shot one woman and injured three other persons, including the synagogue's rabbi. After fleeing the scene, Earnest phoned 9-1-1 and reported the shooting.

In September 2021, Earnest was sentenced by a state court in San Diego County to life in prison without the possibility of parole, plus an additional 121 years to life and another 16 years as part of a plea agreement. In December 2021, Earnest was sentenced in federal court to life in prison with no chance of parole, plus 30 years, with the federal and state life sentences running consecutively instead of concurrently.

Attack 
At approximately 11:23 a.m. PDT, a gunman identified as 19-year-old John Timothy Earnest entered the Chabad of Poway synagogue on the last day of the Jewish holiday of Passover, which fell on a Shabbat. Approximately 100 people were inside the synagogue. 

Earnest carried a Smith & Wesson Model M&P 15 Sport II semiautomatic rifle and was wearing a tactical vest containing five magazines of ten rounds each. In the foyer, he shot and killed 60-year-old Lori Gilbert-Kaye, and then wounded Rabbi Yisroel Goldstein, who had founded the congregation. According to witnesses, Gilbert-Kaye had tried to shield the rabbi from the gunman. 

Earnest then turned to a side room occupied by several people, including a number of children. He fired into the room, wounding one man with a bullet to the leg, and his 8-year-old niece. All the injured were expected to recover. Goldstein lost his right index finger from the shooting, despite four hours of surgery. After Earnest fled, Goldstein spoke to the congregation despite his injury, telling them to stay strong.

Earnest fired eight to ten rounds before his rifle jammed or malfunctioned, which prevented him from creating additional casualties. Two members of the congregation ran toward the shooter. Earnest then fled the synagogue, entering a Honda sedan. Jonathan Morales, an off-duty United States Border Patrolman who was a member of the synagogue, opened fire and hit Earnest's car multiple times, but he fled uninjured.

Shortly thereafter, the suspect phoned 9-1-1 and reported the shooting himself. Earnest left his car and surrendered, and was taken into custody without incident. The rifle, a tactical helmet, and five loaded 10 round magazines, were recovered from Earnest's car. Earnest was wearing a tactical vest when he was arrested.

Surveillance cameras at the synagogue captured video of the shooting. The attack occurred exactly six months after the Pittsburgh synagogue shooting.

Perpetrator 

The San Diego County Sheriff's Department identified the suspect as John Timothy Earnest (born June 8, 1999), a 19-year-old male from the San Diego neighborhood of Rancho Peñasquitos. He was a 2017 graduate of Mt. Carmel High School and a nursing school student at California State University San Marcos. Officials said he had no previous criminal record or contacts with police, and no known connection to any white supremacist group. The shooter apparently attempted to livestream the shooting on Facebook, but failed.

An anti-semitic and racist open letter was posted on 8chan shortly before the shooting and signed with Earnest's name. It said that Jews were preparing a "meticulously planned genocide of the European race", a white genocide conspiracy theory. In the alleged shooter's manifesto, he denied that he had learned anti-semitic beliefs from his family.

Earnest is believed to have written the letter, in which he cited shooters Brenton Tarrant and Robert Bowers for their involvement in the Christchurch mosque shootings and the Pittsburgh synagogue shooting, respectively. He said that Jesus, Paul the Apostle, Martin Luther, Adolf Hitler, Ludwig van Beethoven, "Moon Man" and Pink Guy were figures who inspired him to commit the shooting. Earnest made a joking mention of PewDiePie and referenced "The Day of the Rope", an event from William Luther Pierce's neo-Nazi novel The Turner Diaries (1978), in which African Americans and Hispanics are executed and urged more violent attacks. He condemned President Donald Trump as a pro-Zionist traitor. 

That arson attempt was extinguished with only minor damage to the building and no injuries; graffiti left in the parking lot referred to the earlier Christchurch shooting in New Zealand.

Earnest was a member of the Escondido Orthodox Presbyterian Church, which is affiliated with the theologically traditionalist Orthodox Presbyterian Church. According to The Washington Post, the shooter's manifesto, which expressed Christian motives for killing Jews, resulted in a social media debate among Christian pastors. 

Rev. Duke Kwon of the Presbyterian Church in America expressed concern that the alleged shooter could articulate a Christian theology of personal salvation while also espousing anti-Semitism. He and other ministers denied that Christian theology and Scripture provide support for anti-Semitism. The Orthodox Presbyterian Church issued a statement that "[a]nti-Semitism and racist hatred which apparently motivated the shooter . . . have no place within our system of doctrine."

Legal proceedings 
On April 30, 2019, Earnest was charged in San Diego County Superior Court with one count of murder and three counts of attempted murder. All four charges included "hate-crime and gun allegations", which can incur more severe penalties upon conviction. The murder charge includes a "special circumstance" that Earnest intentionally killed his victim (Gilbert-Kaye) because of her religion, which could incur the death penalty under California law. Earnest pleaded not guilty to all the charges. A criminal complaint was also filed charging Earnest with arson of a house of worship, a reference to the March arson attempt against a mosque in Escondido. Earnest was ordered held without bail. A trial readiness hearing was scheduled for May 30 and a preliminary hearing for July 8.

On May 14, Earnest was arraigned in the United States District Court for the Southern District of California in San Diego on 109 federal charges: 54 counts of obstruction of free exercise of religious beliefs using a dangerous weapon resulting in death, bodily injury and attempts to kill; 54 counts of hate crimes under the Matthew Shepard and James Byrd Jr. Hate Crimes Prevention Act; and one count of damage to a religious property using fire for an earlier arson at Dar-ul-Arquam mosque in Escondido on March 24. Earnest is represented by a federal public defender.

On December 5, the court announced a trial date of June 2, 2020. This date was delayed due to the COVID-19 epidemic and the San Diego County District Attorney's office announced it would seek the death penalty. Prosecutors scheduled a press conference to discuss trial details on March 5 and the trial will not occur until at least March 15, 2021. On July 20, 2021, Earnest pleaded guilty to the charges.

On September 30, 2021, Earnest, now 22, was sentenced to life in prison without the possibility of parole, plus an additional 121 years to life and another 16 years as part of a plea agreement reached with the San Diego County District Attorney's Office.

On December 28, 2021, Earnest was sentenced in San Diego Federal Court to life in prison with no chance of parole, plus 30 years. US District Judge Anthony Battaglia said the federal and state life sentences would run one after the other instead of concurrently. Earnest will serve the sentence in federal custody.

Reactions 

 President of the United States Donald Trump offered "deepest sympathies to the families of those affected" by the shooting.
 Vice President of the United States Mike Pence stated "We condemn in the strongest terms the evil & cowardly shooting at Chabad of Poway today as Jewish families celebrated Passover. No one should be in fear in a house of worship. Antisemitism isn't just wrong - it's evil."
 2020 Democratic Presidential Candidates Bernie Sanders, Kamala Harris, Joe Biden, and Eric Swalwell published statements condemning the attack.
 Governor of California Gavin Newsom responded by saying, "No one should have to fear going to their place of worship, and no one should be targeted for practicing the tenets of their faith." 
 The United States Holocaust Memorial Museum released a statement which read "[M]oving forward this must serve as yet another wake-up call that antisemitism is a growing and deadly menace. All Americans must unequivocally condemn it and confront it whenever it appears."
 Prime Minister of Israel Benjamin Netanyahu stated "I condemn the abhorrent attack on a synagogue in California; this is an attack on the heart of the Jewish people. The international community must step up the struggle against anti-Semitism."
 President of Israel Reuven Rivlin wrote, "The murderous attack on the Jewish community during Pesach, our holiday of freedom, and just before Holocaust Memorial Day, is yet another painful reminder that anti-Semitism and hatred of Jews is still with us, everywhere. No country and no society are immune. Only through education for Holocaust remembrance and tolerance can we deal with this plague."
 At a press conference on the day after the shooting, Rabbi Yisroel Goldstein, who was injured in the shooting, called to "battle darkness with light." He suggested that the United States call for a moment of silence in public schools.
 On April 29, the parents of the suspect issued a formal statement disavowing his actions, reading in part: "To our great shame, he is now part of the history of evil that has been perpetrated on Jewish people for centuries." Their attorney noted that the family will not pay for Earnest's defense, instead leaving him to likely be represented by a public defender.
 The Orthodox Presbyterian Church issued a statement reading in part, "We deplore and resist all forms of anti-Semitism and racism. We are wounded to the core that such an evil could have gone out from our community. Such hatred has no place in any part of our beliefs or practices, for we seek to shape our whole lives according to the love and gospel of Jesus Christ."
 On May 2, 2019, during his remarks in the White House Rose Garden on the National Day of Prayer, President Trump invited Rabbi Yisroel Goldstein and the two men who had chased the suspect out of the synagogue to address the gathering.
 Goldstein was invited by Israeli Ambassador to the United Nations Danny Danon to speak on antisemitism before the UN General Assembly on June 26.
 In December 2019 a Poway street was renamed as Lori Lynn Lane to honor Lori Lynn Gilbert-Kaye, the woman who was killed in the shooting.

See also

 2019 Jersey City shooting
 Colleyville synagogue hostage crisis
 Halle synagogue shooting
 Monsey Hanukkah stabbing
 Pittsburgh synagogue shooting
 Antisemitism in Christianity
 Antisemitism in the United States in the 21st-century
 History of antisemitism in the United States
 List of attacks on Jewish institutions in the United States
 List of synagogue shootings

References

External links 
 "A Terrorist Tried to Kill Me Because I Am a Jew. I Will Never Back Down." Opinion piece by Rabbi Yisroel Goldstein, The New York Times, April 29, 2019.

2019 crimes in California
2019 in Judaism
2019 mass shootings in the United States
2019 murders in the United States
21st-century attacks on synagogues and Jewish communal organizations in the United States
Antisemitism in California
April 2019 crimes in the United States
April 2019 events in the United States
Articles containing video clips
Attacks in the United States in 2019
Attacks on religious buildings and structures in the United States
Deaths by firearm in California
Mass shootings in California
Mass shootings in the United States
Murder in California
Neo-fascist terrorist incidents in the United States
/pol/ phenomena
Poway, California
Terrorist incidents in California
Terrorist incidents in the United States in 2019
White genocide conspiracy theory
2019 active shooter incidents in the United States